The 2004 ASB Classic was a women's tennis tournament played on outdoor hard courts at the ASB Tennis Centre in Auckland, New Zealand that was part of Tier IV of the 2004 WTA Tour. It was the 19th edition of the tournament and took place from 5 January until 10 January 2004. Third-seeded Eleni Daniilidou won her second consecutive singles title at the event and earned $22,000 first-prize money.

Finals

Singles

 Eleni Daniilidou defeated  Ashley Harkleroad, 6–3, 6–2
 It was Daniilidou  1st singles title of the year and the 4th of her career.

Doubles

  Mervana Jugić-Salkić /  Jelena Kostanić defeated  Virginia Ruano Pascual /  Paola Suárez, 7–6(8–6), 3–6, 6–1

Prize money and ranking points

Prize money

* per team

Points distribution

See also
 2004 Heineken Open – men's tournament

References

External links
 ITF tournament edition details
 Tournament draws

2004 WTA Tour
2004
ASB
January 2004 sports events in New Zealand
2004 in New Zealand tennis